My Stars is a 1926 American comedy film directed by Roscoe Arbuckle.

Cast
 Johnny Arthur as The Boy
 Florence Lee as His Mother
 Virginia Vance as The Girl
 George Davis as The Butler
 Glen Cavender as The Gardener

See also
 Fatty Arbuckle filmography

References

External links

1926 films
1926 short films
American silent short films
American black-and-white films
Silent American comedy films
Films directed by Roscoe Arbuckle
Films with screenplays by Roscoe Arbuckle
American comedy short films
1926 comedy films
1920s American films